Chenar (also Romanized as Chenār) is a village in Bidak Rural District, in the Central District of Abadeh County, Fars Province, Iran. At the 2006 census, its population was 205, in 72 families.

References 

Populated places in Abadeh County